Logan Kanapathi is a Canadian politician who was elected to the Legislative Assembly of Ontario during the 2018 general election. He represents the riding of Markham—Thornhill, and is a member of the Progressive Conservative Party of Ontario. He was first elected as a Markham city councillor for Ward 7 in the 2006 Markham municipal election and re-elected as the Ward 7 Councillor in both the 2010 Markham municipal election and the 2014 Markham municipal election. In 2014, Kanapathi sought the Liberal Party of Canada's nomination in the riding for Scarborough North. He was defeated by TDSB Trustee Shaun Chen, who won the federal election in 2015.

Electoral record

Provincial

Municipal

References

Living people
Progressive Conservative Party of Ontario MPPs
21st-century Canadian politicians
Ontario municipal councillors
Canadian people of Tamil descent
Year of birth missing (living people)
Canadian politicians of Sri Lankan descent